Marco Piccinini (born 2 July 1952 in Rome) is a Monegasque sport personality, businessman, and politician.

Personal

Picinnini's father Arnaldo was a pioneer in the Italian electronic industry. In the 1950s he founded an industrial group which included innovative brands such as VOXSON (TV, car radios, hi-fi etc.) and VIDEOCOLOR (color TV picture tubes and other hi-tech electronic components). At the end of the 1960s, due to Arnaldo's declining health, the family disposed of their interests in the various industrial activities and decided to move to Monaco where, after his father's death, Marco focused on his two main interests – finance and motor racing.

Marco studied architecture in Rome, where he also began his involvement in motor racing by cooperating with a Formula 3 constructor and racing team called ‘‘De Sanctis’’. He also received training in the Techniques of International Negotiations at the Graduate Institute of International Studies in Geneva.

In 1997 married Marie-Ahlem and they have a daughter.

Institutional

 2017, Senior Advisor to the Minister of State of the Principality of Monaco.
 2011-2012, Counsellor of Finance and Economy of the Principality of Monaco.

In this capacity he focused particularly on:

- restoring a balanced budget, generating a cash surplus in 2012; 
- Introducing new legislations and process to ensure compliance of Monaco with modern standards in the field of international tax cooperation (OCED - Global Tax Forum) and anti-money laundering (Moneyval); 
- reducing the risk profile of the Monaco National Reserve Fund while preserving its profitability.
 2010, he served as Ambassador of Monaco to China and India

Sport 

Société Monégasque de Constructions Automobiles MP
 1974 - co-founded the first Monegasque racing car manufacturer - Société Monégasque de Constructions Automobiles MP - which produced a few Formula 3 single seaters.

Ferrari
 1977 - appointed by Enzo Ferrari as his representative for Formula 1 matters and shortly afterward  appointed as the ‘‘Direttore Sportivo’’ of the Ferrari Team.[3]
 1978-1988, Motor Sport Director of Ferrari and Team Principal of the Formula 1 Team. In this capacity he was one of the architects of the ‘‘Concorde Agreement’’,  the charter governing regulatory  as well as financial aspects of the Formula 1 World Championship.
 From 1983 until 2016, Member of the Board of Directors of Ferrari SpA.

CSAI - Commissione Sportiva Automobilistica Italiana
 1993-1994, President of CSAI, the Italian Motor Sport commission, and elected in 1994 as a Vice President of FIA, the international Motor Sport Governing Body.
FOA – Formula One Administration
 1998-99, Deputy CEO of FOA and FOM - Formula One Management (commercial rights holders for the Formula 1 World Championship).

FIA – Fédération Internationale de l’Automobile
 1998-2008 Deputy President of FIA, chaired the World Motor Sport Council, the executive body which regulates all motor sport disciplines worldwide. Piccinini was serving out his third term as Deputy President but left his post a year early to focus on other professional commitments.[4]

Monaco Sporting Associations 
 1981-2010 member of the Board of Directors of  Automobile Club de Monaco, the organiser of the Monaco Grand Prix and Monte-Carlo Rally.
 2003-2009, member of the Board of Directors of  AS Monaco Football Club, several times winner of the French Premier League and finalist of the 2004 UEFA Champion's League.

Other positions 

Piccinini currently serves also as a member of :

 the Board of Trustees of the International Theological Institute, Trumau, Austria: a Catholic theological faculty with degrees granted by the Holy See.
 the Board of Directors of FSCIRE - Fondazione per le Scienze Religiose Giovanni XXIII

References 

1952 births
Monegasque businesspeople
Monegasque people of Italian descent
Living people
Ferrari people
Formula One team principals
Ambassadors of Monaco to China
Ambassadors of Monaco to India
Graduate Institute of International and Development Studies alumni
Finance ministers of Monaco
Government ministers of Monaco